An Wang (February 7, 1920 – March 24, 1990) was a Chinese–American computer engineer and inventor, and cofounder of computer company Wang Laboratories, which was known primarily for its dedicated word processing machines. Wang was an important contributor to the development of magnetic-core memory.

Early life and career 
A native of Kunshan County in Suzhou (Soochow) Prefecture, he was born in Shanghai, China. His father taught English at an elementary school outside Shanghai, while his mother Zen Wan (Chien) Wang was a homemaker. He graduated from Shanghai Jiao Tong University with a degree in electrical engineering in 1940. He immigrated to the United States in June 1945 to attend Harvard University for graduate school, earning a PhD in applied physics in 1948. After graduation, he worked at Harvard with Howard Aiken on the design of the Mark IV, Aiken's first fully electronic computer. Wang coinvented the pulse transfer controlling device with Way-Dong Woo, a schoolmate from China who fell ill before their patent was issued. The new device implemented write-after-read which made magnetic core memory possible. Harvard reduced its commitment to computer research in 1951, prompting Wang to start his own engineering business.

Wang Laboratories 
Wang founded Wang Laboratories in June 1951 as a sole proprietorship. The first years were lean and Wang raised  working capital by selling one third of the company to a machine tools manufacturer Warner & Swasey Company.

The company grew slowly and in 1964 sales reached . Wang began making desktop electronic calculators with digital displays, including a centralised calculator with remote terminals for group use.

They began manufacturing word processors in 1974, copying the already popular Xerox Redactron word processor, a single-user, cassette-based product.

In 1976, they started marketing a multi-user, display-based product, based on the Zilog Z80 processor. Typical installations had a master unit (supplying disk storage) connected to intelligent diskless slaves which the operators used. Connections were via dual coax using differential signaling in an 11-bit asynchronous ASCII format clocked at 4.275 MHz. This product became the market leader in the word processing industry. In addition to calculators and word processors, Wang's company diversified into minicomputers in the early 1970s. The Wang 2200 was one of the first desktop computers with a large CRT display and ran a fast hardwired BASIC interpreter. The Wang VS system was a multiuser minicomputer whose instruction set was very close to the design of IBM's System/370. It was not binary-compatible because register usage conventions and system call interfaces were different. The Wang VS serial terminals could be used in data processing mode and word processing mode. They were user-programmable in data-processing mode and used the same word processing software as the earlier dedicated word processing systems.

Wang Laboratories, which in 1989 once employed over 30,000 people, was headquartered in Tewksbury, Massachusetts and later Lowell, Massachusetts. When Wang looked to retire from actively running his company in 1986, he insisted upon handing over the corporate reins to his son Fred Wang. Hard times ensued for the company and the elder Wang was eventually forced to remove his son in 1989.

Later years 
An Wang also founded the Wang Institute of Graduate Studies in Tyngsborough, Massachusetts, which offered a graduate program in software engineering. He made substantial donations to this organization, including the proceeds of his autobiography, Lessons. However, enrollment remained low, and in 1987, after nearly a decade of operation, Wang decided to discontinue funding the institution and transferred ownership of the campus to Boston University.

An Wang also made a substantial contribution for the restoration of a Boston landmark, which was then called the Metropolitan Theatre. The "Met" was renamed in 1983 as The Wang Theatre, and the Metropolitan Center became known as the Wang Center for the Performing Arts. Wang donated $4 million to Massachusetts General Hospital's ambulatory care center, which was renamed to the Wang Building. 

Wang was one of twelve recipients of the Medal of Liberty in 1986. He was inducted into the National Inventors Hall of Fame in 1988. The An Wang Middle School in Lowell, Massachusetts, is named in his honor, as is the An Wang Professorship of Computer Science and Electrical Engineering at Harvard University, held by Roger W. Brockett and Hanspeter Pfister, the An Wang Professorship of Computer Science at Brown University, held by John E. Savage, and the Wang Professorship of Cognitive and Neural Systems at Boston University, held by Stephen Grossberg; see sites.bu.edu/steveg.

An Wang died of cancer in 1990. He and his wife, Lorraine (Chiu) Wang, lived in Lincoln, Massachusetts. Lorraine Wang died on March 1, 2016, at Emerson Hospital in Concord, Massachusetts. They had three children.

Aphorisms 
An Wang is known for a number of pithy aphorisms summing up principles based on his experience in business and life. Examples include:

 "Success is more a function of consistent common sense than it is of genius."
 "We must not contradict, but instruct him that contradicts us; for a madman is not cured by another running mad also."

See also 
 The Wang Center for the Performing Arts
 History of the Chinese in Boston
 Wang's factor-combining method

References

External links 

 Short biography of An Wang

Patents 

  "Pulse transfer controlling device", filed October 21, 1949, issued May 17, 1955
  "Calculating Apparatus" (using logarithms for calculation), filed September 22, 1964, issued September 17, 1968
  "Distributed data processing system", filed June 20, 1977, issued March 20, 1979.
  Ideographic typewriter. October 13, 1981
  Helical print head mechanism. October 27, 1981
  Selective paper insertion and feeding means for individual sheet printing apparatus. June 7, 1983
  Data communication system. December 18, 1984
  High density dot matrix printer. April 2, 1985
  Scanner document positioning device. April 30, 1985
  Management communication terminal system. May 6, 1986
  Method of polling to ascertain service needs. June 17, 1986
  Writing pad. January 20, 1987
  Game racket. December 15, 1987
  Composite document accessing and processing terminal with graphic and text data buffers. July 7, 1992
  Keyboard with finger-actuable and stylus-actuable keys. August 2, 1994

1920 births
1990 deaths
American computer businesspeople
American inventors
Chinese emigrants to the United States
Chinese electrical engineers
American electrical engineers
Businesspeople in software
Deaths from cancer in Massachusetts
People from Lowell, Massachusetts
Businesspeople from Shanghai
Presidential Medal of Freedom recipients
Harvard School of Engineering and Applied Sciences alumni
Engineers from Shanghai
Wang Laboratories
National Chiao Tung University (Shanghai) alumni